Nematocarcinidae is a family of crustaceans belonging to the order Decapoda.

Genera:
 Lenzicarcinus Burukovsky, 2005
 Macphersonus Burukovsky, 2012
 Nematocarcinus Milne-Edwards, 1881
 Nigmatullinus Burukovsky, 1991
 Segonzackomaius Burukovsky, 2011

References

Decapods
Decapod families